Toni Bulaja (born 4 June 1974) is a Croatian sailor. He competed in the men's 470 event at the 2000 Summer Olympics.

References

External links
 

1974 births
Living people
Croatian male sailors (sport)
Olympic sailors of Croatia
Sailors at the 2000 Summer Olympics – 470
Sportspeople from Split, Croatia
21st-century Croatian people
20th-century Croatian people